L.M.S. Law College is a college imparting education in law in Imphal, Manipur. It was established in the year 1958 and offers undergraduate (L.L.B) and postgraduate (L.L.M.) degrees in law.

History
L.M.S. Law College was established in the year 1958 as a private law college. Later, it was converted into a government law college from the year 1981. It offered only undergraduate degree in law (LLB) until 1996. Later, postgraduate degree courses in law (L.L.M.) have been started to meet the emerging needs of the students in their pursuit of higher legal studies in Manipur from the academic year, 1996–97.

See also

References

External links 
 http://lmslawcollege.com/

Colleges affiliated to Manipur University
Law schools in Manipur
Educational institutions established in 1958
1958 establishments in Manipur